Vittorio Sala (1918–1996) was an Italian screenwriter and film director.

Selected filmography
 A Woman Alone (1956)
 Wild Cats on the Beach (1959)
 Colossus and the Amazon Queen (1960)
 I Don Giovanni della Costa Azzurra (1962)
 Berlin, Appointment for the Spies (1965)
 Diamonds Are a Man's Best Friend (1966)

References

Bibliography
 Capua, Michelangelo. Anatole Litvak: The Life and Films. McFarland, 2015.

External links

1918 births
1996 deaths
Italian film directors
20th-century Italian screenwriters
Italian male screenwriters
Film people from Palermo
20th-century Italian male writers